This is a list of what are intended to be the notable top hotels by country, five or four star hotels, notable skyscraper landmarks or historic hotels which are covered in multiple reliable publications. It should not be a directory of every hotel in every country:

Namibia
 Windhoek Country Club Resort, Windhoek

Nauru
 Menen Hotel, Anibare Bay
 OD-N-Aiwo Hotel, Aiwo

Nepal
Grand Hotel Kathmandu, Kathmandu
Hotel Shanker, Kathmandu

Netherlands

 American Hotel, Amsterdam
 Amsterdam Hilton Hotel, Amsterdam
Apollo Hotel Amsterdam
 Hotel de Bilderberg, Oosterbeek
 Grand Hotel Karel V, Utrecht
 Grand Hotel Opduin, De Koog
 Hotel de l'Europe, Amsterdam
 Hotel de Wereld, Wageningen
 Hotel New York, Rotterdam
 Hotel Pulitzer, Amsterdam
 InterContinental Amstel Amsterdam, Amsterdam
Landhuishotel Bloemenbeek, De Lutte
 Lauswolt, Beetsterzwaag
 Lloyd Hotel, Amsterdam
 NH Grand Hotel Krasnapolsky, Amsterdam
 Oud Poelgeest, Oegstgeest
 Swissôtel Amsterdam, Amsterdam
 Townhouse Designhotel Maastricht, Maastricht
 YOTEL, Amsterdam

New Zealand

 Eagles Nest, Bay of Islands
 Eichardt's Hotel, Queenstown
 Excelsior Hotel, Christchurch
 Grand Hotel, Auckland
 Langham Hotel, Auckland
 Metropolis, Auckland
 Museum Hotel de Wheels, Wellington
 Princes Wharf, Auckland
 Skycity Auckland, Auckland
 St. George Hotel, Wellington

Cook Islands
Aitutaki Lagoon Private Island Resort, Aitutaki

Tokelau
 Luana Liki Hotel, Nukunonu

Nicaragua
 Santa María de Ostuma, Matagalpa
 Selva Negra Mountain Resort, Matagalpa

Niger
Taguelmoust, Agadez

Nigeria

Niue
Niue Hotel

North Korea

 Chongnyon Hotel, P'yongyang
 Kaesong Folk Hotel, Kaesong
 Koryo Hotel, P'yongyang
 Ryugyong Hotel, P'yongyang
 Yanggakdo Hotel, P'yongyang

Norway

Dr. Holms Hotel, Geilo
Fru Haugans Hotel, Mosjøen
 Grand Hotel, Oslo
 Holmenkollen Park Hotel Rica, Holmenkollen, Oslo
Hotel Alexandra, Loen
 Hotel Bristol, Oslo
 Hotel Continental, Oslo
 Hotel Royal Christiania, Oslo
 Kongsvoll, Drivdalen valley
 Oslo Plaza, Oslo
 Radisson SAS Scandinavia Hotel Oslo, Oslo
 Refsnes Gods, near Moss
Rica Seilet Hotel, Molde

Svalbard

Oman
Shangri-La's Barr Al Jissah Resort & Spa

References

N